André Sougarret is a Chilean mining engineer who is currently the CEO of Codelco. Previously he led the rescue efforts of the 2010 Copiapó mining accident, and has been director of El Teniente mine, and executive vice-president of Empresa Nacional de Minería. Following his leadership in the rescue of the 2010 Copiapó mining accident's 33 miners he was named "engineer of the year" and "mining engineer of the year" by the Chilean engineers' association. In the movie The 33 Sougarret was portrayed by Gabriel Byrne. The film incorrectly portrays Sougarett halting the rescue operation due to safety concerns, a decision he did not make in the real rescue effort.

References

Chilean chief executive officers
Chilean mining engineers
Living people
Year of birth missing (living people) 
Date of birth missing (living people)
Place of birth missing (living people)